Institut Teknologi Telkom (now : Telkom University)  (IT Telkom, formerly known as Sekolah Tinggi Teknologi Telkom or STT Telkom) (1990-2013) was a vocational university specializing in  telecommunication engineering.  It was established on September 28, 1990 by the Telkom Education Foundation, which is owned by PT Telkom, the semi-privatized government-owned telecommunication company of Indonesia. The school with 480.000 m² area was in Dayeuhkolot, 3 km south of Bandung. In August 2013, the institution was merged with Telkom Education Foundation's 3 other institutions, Telkom Institute of Management, Telkom Politechnics, and Telkom Creative Arts Schools to form  Telkom University

IT Telkom focused on a program to support the development of telecommunication technologies and industries by providing skilled professionals. In its early years of 1991 and 1992, PT Telkom provided scholarship to all students with job contracts at the company after graduation.

In 2005, IT Telkom tied with China's largest telecommunication manufacturer and wireless provider, ZTE, to establish a telecommunication center at the school's campus.

Faculties
 Faculty of Electrical Engineering and Communications
 Faculty of Informatics Engineering
 Faculty of Industrial Engineering
 Faculty of Science
 Faculty of Postgraduate

Laboratories

Laboratories of PPDU
 Physics Laboratory
 English Laboratory
 Mathematic and Statistics Laboratory

Laboratories of the Faculty of Informatics Engineering
 Common Laboratory
 Database Research Laboratory
 Software Engineering Laboratory
 Programming Laboratory
 Teleinformatics and Operating System Laboratory
 Hardware and Networking Laboratory
 Artificial Intelligence Research Laboratory
 Multimedia Laboratory
 Data Mining Center Laboratory
 Computation Laboratory
 Formal Language Laboratory - new
 Open Source Laboratory - new

Laboratories of the Faculty of Electrical Engineering and Communications
 Internet Application Research and Development Laboratory
 Electrical Circuit Laboratory
 Basic Electronics Laboratory
 Digital Technique Laboratory
 Electrical Measurement and Instrumentation Laboratory
 Electronics System Design Laboratory
 Digital Signal Processing Laboratory
 Control and Adaptor Laboratory
 Microprocessor Laboratory
 Communication System Laboratory
 Electronics Communication Laboratory
 Mobile Communication Laboratory
 Microwave and Remote Sensing Laboratory
 Basic Digital Microwave Laboratory
 Antenna and Propagation Laboratory
 Fiber Optic Communication System Laboratory
 Transmission Channel Laboratory
 Computer and Communication Laboratory
 Switching Technique Laboratory
 Basic Digital Switching Laboratory
 Integrated Management System Laboratory
 Access and Networking Laboratory
 Multimedia Laboratory
 Data Communication Laboratory
 Mechatronics Laboratory

Laboratories of the Faculty of Industrial Engineering
 Work Design Analysis and Ergonomics Laboratory
 Industrial Statistics and Operational Research Laboratory
 Technical Drawing and Studio Design Laboratory
 Production and Automation Laboratory
 Business Simulation Laboratory
 Design of Telecommunication Facilities Laboratory
 Techno-Economy Laboratory
 Operating Systems and Computer Networks Laboratory
 Basic Programming and Database Laboratory
 Business Process Analysis and Design Laboratory

External links
Official Site
Students Community of IT Telkom

References

Universities in Indonesia